Tall Cool One may refer to:

Tall Cool One (novel), the fourth novel in the "A-List" series by Zoey Dean 2005 
"Tall Cool One" (The Fabulous Wailers song), 1959 and 1964
"Tall Cool One" (Robert Plant song) 1988